Verena Eberhardt (born 6 December 1994) is an Austrian road and track cyclist, who currently rides for UCI Women's Continental Team . Representing Austria at international competitions, Eberhardt competed at the 2016 UEC European Track Championships in the points race event and scratch event.

Major results

2013
National Track Championships
1st  Individual pursuit
2nd Omnium
2nd Points race
2nd 500m Time Trial
3rd Scratch race
2nd National U23 Road Championships, Time Trial

2014
National Track Championships
1st  500m Time Trial
1st  Individual pursuit
1st  Points race
1st  Scratch
1st  Omnium

2015
GP Czech Cycling Federation
2nd Points Race
2nd Scratch Race
3rd 500m Time Trial

2016
National Track Championships
1st  500m Time Trial
1st  Individual pursuit
1st  Points race
1st  Scratch
1st  Elimination race
Dublin Track Cycling International
1st Points Race 
2nd Keirin
2nd Scratch Race
3rd Omnium
3rd Individual Pursuit

2017
National Track Championships
1st  Sprint
1st  500m Time Trial
1st  Individual pursuit
1st  Points race
1st  Scratch
1st  Omnium

2018
National Track Championships
1st  Points race
1st  Scratch race
1st  Omnium

References

External links

1994 births
Living people
Austrian female cyclists
Austrian track cyclists
Place of birth missing (living people)
Cyclists at the 2019 European Games
European Games medalists in cycling
European Games bronze medalists for Austria
21st-century Austrian women